"The Breaks" is a 1980 single by American rapper Kurtis Blow from his self-titled debut album. It peaked at #87 on the Billboard Hot 100. It was the first certified gold rap song, and the second certified gold 12-inch single. In 2008, the song ranked #10 on VH1's 100 Greatest Hip-Hop Songs.

Lyrics and structure
"The Breaks" repeats the word "break" (or any of its homophones) 84 times over six and a half minutes. It features six breakdowns (seven including the outro) while there are three definitions for "break," "to break" or "brakes" used in the lyrics. Unlike most hip-hop songs which sample prerecorded funk, the funk beat in this song is original (contrary to suggestions that it sampled "Long Train Runnin'" by The Doobie Brothers).

Chart performance
The single hit #87 on the U.S. Billboard Hot 100, #4 on the U.S. Billboard R&B chart, and #9 on the U.S. Billboard dance chart.

Certifications
It sold over 500,000 copies, becoming the first rap song to earn a gold certification from the RIAA and the second 12-inch single to earn a gold certification, following "No More Tears (Enough Is Enough)" by Barbra Streisand and Donna Summer.

Media
The song has also featured in few games: the 2002 game Grand Theft Auto: Vice City on the fictional in-game radio station "Wildstyle", the 2005 game True Crime: New York City, the 2006 game Scarface: The World Is Yours and 2011 Kinect game Dance Central 2.

Samples
It has been sampled by others, including the background beat being used in Organized Rhyme's song "Check The O.R." and the 2005 reggaeton single, "Chacarron Macarron" by El Chombo 

The female rap group Nadanuf remade the song alongside Kurtis Blow on their 1997 album Worldwide. Blow re-recorded the song on the album Tricka Technology by A Skillz and Krafty Kuts.
H

H.O.T's Tony Ahn rapped the portions of The Breaks  as an uncredited vocal for the intro of S.E.S.'s "I'm Your Girl".

References

1980 singles
Kurtis Blow songs
Funk-rap songs
1979 songs
Mercury Records singles